John Robinson (1822–1900) was an innkeeper, postmaster, and politician who represented Cumberland County, Virginia in the Virginia Constitutional Convention of 1868 and later served in the Virginia Senate representing Cumberland and adjoining counties (the district boundaries changing between elections).

Early life
Robinson was born free in Cumberland County, Virginia. His formal education was limited. Because of his common name, it is unclear which of at least two married men he was. Farmer John Robinson of Madison in Cumberland County district 77 in 1880 was mulatto and 61 years old, in a household which included his 30 year old wife or daughter Martha and sons Johnny (age 19) and Floyd (age 16, who also served as a mail carrier). The same man in 1870 was 53 with a 43 year old wife Magania, three teenage and younger male workers of different last names and a black female domestic servant In 1860 the same man was listed as farming near the Oak Forest post office with his wife Margary (age 32) sons Edwin D. Robinson (age 13) and John W. Robinson (age 11) both attending school; he may be the John b. Robinson owning 10 slaves. Another mulatto John Robinson of the Leigh district in nearby Amelia county in 1870 had a 37 year old wife and adult sons/farm laborers Charles, Sammy and Lee, as well as daughters Emaline and Dora and young sons Tommy, Edward and Sam.

Career

As an adult, in 1857 Robinson purchased his first property of twenty-four acres, which included a tavern at the Cumberland County Court House which served only white customers (providing meals and lodging), and an additional sixteen acres.

In 1867, Cumberland County voters elected Robinson to the Virginia Constitutional Convention of 1868. A Republican, he was the sole delegate elected from Cumberland County.

Voters from Cumberland and adjoining counties twice elected Robinson to the Senate of Virginia. He was elected in 1869 to a district that also included Amelia and Nottoway Counties. Following the census of 1870, the district's boundaries were again altered, removing Nottoway County and substituting Prince Edward County instead. Thus Robinson served during the sessions 1869/70, 1870/71, 1871/72 and 1872/73. His successor, Edgar Allan was a white lawyer, also Republican, and who had emigrated from England.

In addition to his tavern, Robinson owned horses, carriages and wagons, thus enjoying a comfortable life.

Death
John Robinson died in 1900.

See also
African-American officeholders during and following the Reconstruction era

References

Bibliography

Republican Party Virginia state senators
1822 births
1900 deaths
People from Cumberland County, Virginia
African-American state legislators in Virginia
19th-century American politicians